Zdeněk Košťál is a retired slalom canoeist who competed for Czechoslovakia from the late 1950s to the mid-1960s. He won two silver medals in the folding K-1 team event at the ICF Canoe Slalom World Championships, earning them in 1959 and 1961.

References

Czechoslovak male canoeists
Possibly living people
Year of birth missing (living people)
Medalists at the ICF Canoe Slalom World Championships